Live in Stockholm 1961 is an album by featuring live performances by jazz musician John Coltrane recorded in November 1961 at the Koncerthusen, Stockholm.

Reception

AllMusic awarded the album 4½ stars.

Track listing
 "My Favorite Things" — 20:48
 "Blue Train" — 8:54
 "Naima" — 4:00
 "Impressions" — 7:11

Personnel

 John Coltrane — tenor saxophone/soprano saxophone
 Eric Dolphy — flute/alto saxophone
 McCoy Tyner — piano
 Reggie Workman — double bass  
 Elvin Jones — drums

References

John Coltrane live albums
1961 live albums